Mangifera transversalis is a species of plant in the family Anacardiaceae. It is a tree endemic to the Maluku Islands in Indonesia.

References

transversalis
Endemic flora of the Maluku Islands
Trees of the Maluku Islands
Vulnerable plants
Taxonomy articles created by Polbot
Taxa named by André Joseph Guillaume Henri Kostermans